The Avar Khanate, the Avar Nutsaldom, also known as Khundzia or Avaria, was a long-lived Avar state, which controlled mountainous parts of Dagestan (in the North Caucasus) from the early 13th century to the 19th century.

History 
Between the 5th and 12th centuries, Georgian Orthodox Christianity was introduced to the Avar valleys. The fall of the Christian Kingdom of Sarir in the early 12th century and later weakening of neighbouring Georgians by the Mongol invasions, who made their first appearance in the Caucasus with approximately 20,000 warriors led by Subutai and Jebe, terminated further Christian Georgian presence in this area. In fact, numerous traces of Christianity (crosses, chapels) are found within the Avar territory and it is now assumed that Christianity, penetrating from Georgia, survived among the Avars down to the 14th-15th centuries.

After ravaging Georgia, the Mongols cut across the Caucasus Mountains during the winter to get around the Derbent Pass. Although the Avars had pledged their support to Muhammad II of Khwarezm (reigned 1200-1220) in his struggle against the Mongols, there is no documentation for the Mongol invasion of the Avar lands. As historical clues are so scarce, it is probably fruitless to speculate whether the Avars were the agents of the Mongol influence in the Caucasus and whether they were entrusted with the task of levying tribute for the khan, as modern historian Murad Magomedov suggests.

The Golden Horde overran the region in 1241, but by the 14th century, the newly established Avar Khanate managed to maintain independence from the Mongols. The rise of the Shamkhalate of Kazi-Kumukh following the disintegration of the Golden Horde in the 15th century was at once a symptom and a cause of the khans' diminished influence during the 15th and 16th centuries. The khanate was a loosely structured state, sometimes forced to seek the Tsar's protection against its powerful enemies, while many mountainous communities (djamaats) obtained a considerable degree of autonomy from the khan.

In the 16th century the region was the center of a fierce struggle for control by the Ottomans and the Safavids. Under Turkish influence, in the 17th century the majority of the Avar tribes adopted Islam. The consolidation of Islam in Avaristan in the 18th century resulted in a series of religious wars against the Georgian states, these sporadic forays are also known as Lekianoba in Georgian historiography. The references to these raids appear in the Epic poetry of Avars; the names of rulers who lead the most devastating attacks, Umma-Khan, Nursal-Bek, and Mallachi, are mentioned in Georgian sources.

In the 18th century, the steady weakening of the Shamkhals fostered the ambitions of the Avar khans, whose greatest coup was the defeat of the 100,000-strong army of Nader Shah in September 1741 during his conquest of Dagestan. In the wake of this success, Avar sovereigns managed to expand their territory at the expense of free communities in Dagestan and Chechnya. The reign of Umma-Khan (from 1775 to 1801) marked the zenith of the Avar ascendancy in the Caucasus. Potentates who paid tribute to Umma-Khan included the rulers of Shaki, Quba, and Shirvan.

Within two years after Umma-Khan's death, the khanate voluntarily submitted to Russian authority. Yet the Russian administration disappointed and embittered freedom-loving highlanders. The institution of heavy taxation, coupled with the expropriation of estates and the construction of fortresses, electrified the Avar population into rising under the aegis of the Muslim Imamate, led by Ghazi Mohammed (1828–32), Gamzat-bek (1832–34) and Imam Shamil (1834–59). This Caucasian War raged until 1864, when the Avar Khanate was abolished and the Avar District was instituted instead.

Since 1864, the Avar Khanate has been annexed to Russia.

List of rulers 

 The first ruler by name - Avar (VI century)
 unknown rulers
 Abuhosro (mid-VIII century)
 Khosro (it is not known exactly whether he ruled), the son of the previous
 unknown rulers
 Uruskhan (Aruskhan)
 Khidirshah, son of the previous
 Tarraz, son of the previous
 Abbas, son of the previous
 Safishah, son of the previous
 Khavadshah, son of the previous
 Firavn, son of the previous
 Amir, son of the previous
 Said, son of the previous
 Tahmaz, son of the previous
 Fardin (Perid), son of the previous
 Bayar, son of the previous
 Namrud, son of the previous
 Kad (Bakir), son of the previous
 Firudshah (Prussianshah), son of the previous
 Toku son of Firuja (mid-11th century)
 Ummakhan, son of Firudshah
 Uruskhan (Aulkhan), son of the previous
 Saratan I, son of the previous
 Surakat I (XII century), son of the previous
 Ahmad, usurper (XII century)
 Abu Muslim, usurper (XII century)
 Bayar ((XII century)), son of Surakat
 Masum-bek (XII century)
 Sultan ibn Masum-bek (XII century)
 Chufan ibn Sultan (until 1185)
 Amir-Ahmad ibn Chufan (since 1185)
 Andunik (Amir-Sultan) (XII century), son of Bayar
 Malik Saratan (second half of the 13th century)
 unknown nucals
 Surakat (1362-1396,early 1430s) 
 Bayr (early 1430s-?), son of the previous
 unknown nucals
 Shamkhal son of Alibek (possibly Nutsal, but this is not certain) (turn of the 14th-15th centuries)
 Saratan III
 Dugong, son of the previous
 Ibrahim I
 Muhammed-Mirza, son-in-law of the previous one and son of Duguna
 Andunik I (1460—1485), son of Ibrahim I
 Bulach I (1485—1510) nephew of the previous one and son of Muhammad-Mirza
 Amir-Khamza I (1510—before 1523), son of Ummakhan, son of Bulach I
 Shaban (mentioned in 1523/1524y), possibly the son of the previous one
 Nutsal Khan I (1540—1546), possibly the son of Amir-Khamza
 Andunik II (1546 - December 1569), the son of the previous one or possibly the son of Shaban
 Ahmad (mentioned in 1547/1548) or Barty I (1569—1570), sons of the previous 
 Muhammad-Shvankhal (before 1589a), son of Turarava, brother of Andunik II
 Kanbuluk (most likely Ghann-Bulat ) (неизвестно), son of the previous
 Shvankhal-nutsal I (before 1596a), brother of the previous one, or the same person with Kanbuluk
 Muhammad-nutsal I (late 16th century), son of Kushkanti-Khilav, son of Barti I
 Ibrahim II (mentioned in 1600/1601y), possibly the son of Shvankhal-nutsal I
 Mahdi I (mentioned in 1610 and ap. 1614), possibly the son of Ibrahim or the son of Muhammed-Shvankhala
 Umma Khan the Just (before 1634/1635a), son of Shvankhal-nutsala
 Amir-Khamza II (1634/1635—1646), son of Barti-Khilava, son of Muhammad-nutsal I
 Muldar Mirza I (mentioned in 1650y)
 Dugri I (mentioned in 1656y — died in 1667/1668y), son of Andunik (Ummakhan), the son of Umma Khan the Just or directly the son of Ummakhan
 Muhammad-nutsal II (1667/1668—1687), son of the previous
 Umma Khan II (1687—1698), son of the previous
 Andunik III, son of the previous
 Dugry II (1698—1706), brother of the previous
 Umma Khan III (1706—1709), son of Dugri II
 Muhammad Nutsal III (1709—1713 or 1725), brother of previous
 Umma Khan IV (1725—1735), son of Elder Bulach, son of Dugri II
 Khankalav (1722—1730), co-ruler, brother of the previous
 Nutsal Khan II (1735—1744), son of Ummakhan III
 Mahmud Khan I (1744 - ?)
 Muhammad-nutsal IV (? - 1774), son of Ummakhan IV
 Umma Khan V (1774 - April 1801), son of the previous
 Gebek Khan I (1801 - January 1802), brother of the previous
 Sultan Ahmed Khan I (1802—1823), son of Ali Sultan of Mehtulin
 Surkhay Khan I (1818—1834), son of Gebek Khan I. Khan was recognized only by the Russian administration. Power was in the hands of Sultan Ahmed Khan I (1802—1823)
 Aslan-Hussein Khan I (1827—1828). Khan was recognized only by the Russian administration. Power was in the hands of Abu Sultan Khan I (1823—1834), son of Sultan Ahmed Khan I
 Abu Sultan Khan I (1828—1834), son of Sultan Ahmed- Khan I
 Bakhu Bike I (1834—1834), daughter of Umma Khan V
 Sultan Ahmed Khan II (1834—1836), with him regents:
 Aslan-Hussein Khan I (1834—1836), again
 Nutsal-Aga I (1836), son of the previous
 Muhammad Mirza I (1834—1836), brother of the previous
 Ahmad Khan (1836—1843), ruler of the Mehtuli Khanate
 Temporary rulers:
 foreman Aitber (1843)
 bek Himmat I (1843)
 Qadi Muhammad (1843)
In 1837—1859 - as part of the Imamat
 Ibrahim Khan (1859—1864), son of Ahmad Khan of Mekhtulinsky

See also 
 List of Sunni Muslim dynasties
 Pannonian Avars
 Gebek Janku ibn Muhammad

Bibliography 
 History of Dagestan, vol. 1–4. Moscow, 1967–69.

References 

History of Dagestan
Former monarchies of Europe
1864 disestablishments
States and territories established in the 13th century
Khanates
Khanates of the North Caucasus